Dorothy Townshend, Viscountess Townshend ( Walpole), was an English aristocrat, born on 18 September 1686 at Houghton Hall. She was the thirteenth child born to Robert Walpole and Mary Burwell.

Sometime before 25 July 1713, she married Charles Townshend, 2nd Viscount Townshend, and became his second wife. She died under mysterious circumstances, or possibly of smallpox, on 29 March 1726.

Family
Children of the 2nd Viscount Townshend and Dorothy Walpole:
 Hon. George Townshend b.1715 d. Aug 1769
 Hon. Augustus Townshend b.1716 d.1746.
 Hon. Horatio Townshend b.1718 d.1764.
 Very Rev. Hon. Edward Townshend b. 25 Oct 1719, d. 27 Jan 1765, Dean of Norwich (1761–1765), Canon of Westminster (1749–1761)
 Hon. Richard Townshend b.1721 d. at a young age.
 Hon. Dorothy Townshend b.1722 d.1779.
 Hon. Mary Townshend married Lieutenant General Edward Cornwallis (1724 – 14 Jan 1776), son of Charles Cornwallis, 4th Baron Cornwallis of Eye and Lady Charlotte Butler, in 1763

Legends
Based on rumours that she was caught in an affair with Thomas Wharton, 1st Marquess of Wharton, before her marriage to Charles and never told him, she is said to have been possibly locked up in Raynham Hall before a mock funeral took place. She is alleged to be the identity of the Brown Lady of Raynham Hall.

References

1726 deaths
1686 births
Dorothy
Dorothy
English viscountesses